The 1982 Amateur World Series was the 27th Amateur World Series (AWS), an international men's amateur baseball tournament. The tournament was sanctioned by the International Baseball Federation (which titled it the Baseball World Cup as of the 1988 tournament). The tournament took place, for the only time, in South Korea, from 4 September to 14 September, and was won by South Korea in its first AWS victory.

There were 10 participating countries.

Standings

Awards
The IBAF announced the following awards at the completion of the tournament.

Notable players

References
Men: World Cup at Sports123.com

Baseball World Cup
Amateur World Series
1982
1982 in South Korean sport
September 1982 sports events in Asia